The 1944 United States presidential election in Mississippi took place on November 7, 1944, as part of the 1944 United States presidential election. Mississippi voters chose nine representatives, or electors, to the Electoral College, who voted for president and vice president.

Mississippi was won by incumbent President Franklin D. Roosevelt (D–New York), running with Senator Harry S. Truman, with 93.56% of the popular vote, against  Governor Thomas E. Dewey (R–New York), running with Governor John Bricker, with 6.44% of the popular vote. 

As of 2020, this marks the last time that any candidate has received over ninety percent of the popular vote in any state, or that Forrest County has voted for a Democratic presidential candidate. It was also the last time until 1972 that Mississippi would back the national winner in a presidential election. This was the last election in which every county voted for the Democrats in the Magnolia State. The next election would also see all the state's counties go to just one party, albeit to the Dixiecrats rather than the Democrats. The same would be true of 1964, when all the state's counties went entirely to the Republican Party.

Results

Results by county

Notes

References

Mississippi
1944